Tapfuma Nomsa Moyo, known as Nomsa Moyo, is a Zimbabwean former footballer who played as a midfielder. Nicknamed Boys or Boyz, she has been a member of the Zimbabwe women's national team.

Club career
Moyo has played for New Orleans in Zimbabwe.

International career
Moyo capped for Zimbabwe at senior level during the 2000 African Women's Championship and two Africa Women Cup of Nations qualifications (2002 and 2004).

International goals
Scores and results list Zimbabwe goal tally first

References

Living people
Zimbabwean women's footballers
Women's association football forwards
Zimbabwe women's international footballers
Year of birth missing (living people)